Homewood is a village in Cook County, Illinois, United States. The population was 19,463 at the 2020 census.

The village sits just a few miles south of Chicago proper. It is bordered by Chicago Heights and Flossmoor to the south, Hazel Crest to the west, East Hazel Crest and Harvey to the north, Glenwood to the east, and South Holland to the northeast.

Geography 
A south suburban village, Homewood is  due south of The Loop/downtown Chicago at 800 west and 18300 south on the Chicago grid system.

Homewood lies on the Calumet Shoreline. The ancient shoreline can be seen clearly as the sand ridge along Ridge Road.

Economy
Its historic downtown centered at the intersections of Dixie Highway and Ridge road has a number of small businesses including coffee shops and restaurants, salons, a music shop, bookstore, La Banque boutique hotel, and the Homewood Science Center. Homewood's other main commercial corridor is located along Halsted street between 183rd and 175th street and is home to a number of large national chain retailers.

Large employers
American headquarters for Canadian National Railways. Homewood's CN campus has hosted over 15,000 CN employees and has a training facility.

Global Headquarters for Tempo Global Resources (formerly Hunter Douglas Metals).

Corporate offices for Carl Buddig & Company.

Headquarters for Homewood Disposal Residential, Commercial, and Industrial waste service.

Parks and greenspaces

H-F Parks
Homewood's "H-F Park District" spans over 365 acres with 32 parks and recreation spaces. Homewood's unique parks include Lion's Club Park and Pool, H-F Ice Arena, Irons Oaks Environmental Learning Center, H-F Racquet Club, Rover's Run Dog Park, Extreme Scene Skate park, Millennium Park Splash Pad, Patriots Park Frisbee Golf Course, and Dolphin Lake Park and Clubhouse.

Izaak Walton Preserve
Homewood's Izaak Walton Preserve is a 193 acre open space filled with woodland, lakes, and diverse wildlife carved out from an ancient glacial lake and sandy shoreline. Roughly 4 miles of gravel walking path wind through the scenic and rolling prairie throughout the preserve. Fishing, biking, running, and dog-walking are common activities along the preserve's trail system.

Media

Newspapers
The HF Chronicle is a local newspaper serving the Homewood and Floosmoor communities started in June 2014.

Radio
WHFH (88.5FM) - Viking Radio is Homewood-Floosmoor Highschool's radio station based on campus.

Government

Homewood Village Board

Village President - Rich Hofeld

Village Clerk - Marilyn Thomas

Trustee CeCe Belue

Trustee Vivian Harris-Jones

Trustee Jay Heiferman

Trustee Lisa Purcell

Trustee Lauren Roman

Trustee Julie Willis

Village Manager, Napoleon Haney

State legislature

Illinois State Senate
 State Senator Napoleon Harris D-Flossmoor, Illinois, 15th Legislative District

Illinois State House of Representatives
State Representative Will Davis D-East Hazel Crest, 30th Representative District

Federal
United States House of Representatives
Congresswoman Robin Kelly D-Chicago, Illinois's 2nd congressional district

United States Senate
Senator Dick Durbin D-Illinois (elected 1997)
Senator Tammy Duckworth D-Illinois (elected 2017)

Education 
Children in grades K-8 attend schools under the jurisdiction of Homewood public school district 153, although some may attend Flossmoor School District 161 if they live west of Western Avenue and south of 183rd street.  School District 153 has three schools: Winston Churchill Elementary, Willow Elementary, and James Hart Junior High School. Children in grades K-2 attend Willow, then move on to Churchill for grades 3-5, then move on to finish grades 6-8 at James Hart. Homewood School District 153.

The majority of students in the area then go on to attend the local public high school, Homewood-Flossmoor High School. Homewood-Flossmoor High School is its own school district, school district 233. H-F is a three-time winner of the U.S. Department of Education's Blue Ribbon Award for excellence. HF also owns WHFH 88.5, the highest powered high school radio station with 1,500 watts.

The Roman Catholic Archdiocese of Chicago operated a Catholic school, St. Joseph School. It closed in 2017. It had 64 students in 2017.

Demographics 
As of the 2020 census there were 19,463 people, 6,964 households, and 4,910 families residing in the village. The racial makeup of the village was 44.87% African American, 43.17% White, 0.18% Native American, 1.29% Asian, 0.01% Pacific Islander, 3.23% from other races, and 7.25% from two or more races. Hispanic or Latino of any race were 8.35% of the population.

There were 6,964 households, out of which 64.60% had children under the age of 18 living with them, 50.32% were married couples living together, 17.29% had a female householder with no husband present, and 29.49% were non-families. 27.28% of all households were made up of individuals, and 11.73% had someone living alone who was 65 years of age or older. The average household size was 3.26 and the average family size was 2.63.

The village's age distribution consisted of 26.1% under the age of 18, 6.2% from 18 to 24, 25.4% from 25 to 44, 25.5% from 45 to 64, and 16.7% who were 65 years of age or older. The median age was 39.3 years. For every 100 females, there were 92.7 males. For every 100 females age 18 and over, there were 86.4 males.

The median income for a household in the village was $77,013, and the median income for a family was $91,704. Males had a median income of $58,214 versus $40,314 for females. The per capita income for the village was $33,243. About 5.8% of families and 7.9% of the population were below the poverty line, including 7.8% of those under age 18 and 11.3% of those age 65 or over.

Note: the US Census treats Hispanic/Latino as an ethnic category. This table excludes Latinos from the racial categories and assigns them to a separate category. Hispanics/Latinos can be of any race.

Rail transportation 

Amtrak provides rail service to Homewood. Amtrak Train 59, the southbound City of New Orleans, is scheduled to depart Homewood at 8:54 pm daily with service to Kankakee and points south through Tennessee and Mississippi to New Orleans. Amtrak Train 58, the northbound City of New Orleans, is scheduled to depart Homewood at 7:44 am daily with service to Chicago Union Station. Homewood is also served by Amtrak Train 390/391, the Saluki, daily in the morning, and Amtrak Train 392/393, the Illini, daily in the afternoon/evening. Both the Saluki and Illini operate between Chicago and Carbondale, Illinois. Metra also provides commuter rail service on the Metra Electric line between Millennium Station and University Park. Homewood is the American headquarters of Canadian National Railways including a large freight classification yard and major shop facilities.

Notable residents

 Sarah Bloom Raskin, 13th United States Deputy Secretary of the Treasury
 J Harlen Bretz, geologist, best known for his research that led to the acceptance of the Missoula Floods.
 Brian Colin, video game designer (Rampage, Arch Rivals, General Chaos)
 John Doody, member of the Illinois House of Representatives. He served as Mayor of Homewood prior to his tenure in the Illinois House.
 Peter Doran, geologist specializing in Antarctic climate and ecosystems. He is a native of Homewood.
 Manny Hoffman, member of the Illinois House of Representatives. He served as Mayor of Homewood prior to his tenure in the Illinois House.
 George Nolfi, scriptwriter and producer (Ocean's Twelve, The Bourne Ultimatum, The Adjustment Bureau)
 Susan D. Page, 1st United States Ambassador to South Sudan. She was raised in Homewood.
 Eugene Parker, solar astrophysicist who developed the theory of the supersonic solar wind. He lived in Homewood while a professor at the University of Chicago.
 Quintin E. Primo III, co-founder of Capri Capital Partners, LLC
 Steve Sarowitz, founder of Paylocity Corporation. He was born and raised in Homewood.
 Jermaine Stewart, an American R&B singer best known for his 1986 hit single "We Don't Have to Take Our Clothes Off", which peaked at number five on the Billboard Hot 100. Died in Homewood.
 Juice Wrld, rapper, singer, and songwriter. He was raised in Homewood after his family moved there in 1999.

See also
Homewood Memorial Gardens

References

External links 
 
 Think Homewood

Villages in Illinois
Villages in Cook County, Illinois
Chicago metropolitan area
Populated places established in 1834
1834 establishments in Illinois
Majority-minority cities and towns in Cook County, Illinois